= Aletta Beck =

Dutch poet

Aletta Beck (about 1667, in Arnhem – after 1740, in Cape Town) was a Dutch poet, best known for her collection of poems Mengel-digten (1750). She was alternatively known as Aletta Bek, Aletta van Meurs, or Aletta Slotsboo. She lived in the Cape Colony.
